Delta Boötis, Latinized from δ Boötis, is a double star in the northern constellation of Boötes, forming the easternmost member of the constellation's kite-shaped asterism of brighter stars. This star is sometimes called Princeps , meaning prince or prime in Latin. The origin of this name is unclear, although it usually appears in an astrological context. The apparent visual magnitude of this star is 3.5, making it visible to the naked eye even during a Full Moon. The magnitude 7.81 companion can be viewed in binoculars or a small telescope.

Properties

This system consists of a pair of stars located in physical proximity to each other and sharing a similar motion through space, suggesting that they may form a binary star system. Based upon their angular separation and their distance, they have a projected separation of 3,800 Astronomical Units (AU). However, their separation along the line of sight from the Earth remains uncertain, so all that can really be said is that they are separated by at least 3,800 AU. If they are gravitationally bound to each other, it requires a minimum of 120,000 years to complete an orbit.

The brighter member of the pair has a stellar classification of G8 III, indicating that it has exhausted the supply of hydrogen at its core and evolved into a giant star. It now has a radius more than ten times the radius of the Sun. Compared to the Sun, this star appears deficient in elements other than hydrogen and helium—what astronomers term the star's metallicity. The outer envelope of this star has an effective temperature of 4,847 K, which is what gives it the characteristic yellow hue of a G-type star.

The secondary component has a stellar classification of G0 V, which suggests it is a main sequence star that may be similar in physical properties to the Sun. The apparent visual magnitude of this star is 7.81, making it much less luminous than the primary component.

References

External links
 HR 5681
 CCDM J15156+3319
 Image Delta Boötis

G-type giants
G-type main-sequence stars
Binary stars
Boötes
Bootis, Delta
Durchmusterung objects
Bootis, 49
135722
074666
5681